Yankeetown is the name of 5 different populated places within the state of Ohio.

Yankeetown, Brown County, Ohio
Yankeetown, Darke County, Ohio
Yankeetown, Fayette County, Ohio
Yankeetown, Ross County, Ohio
Yankeetown, Tuscarawas County, Ohio